Tracy Lazenby (second ¼ ), also known by the nickname of "OHMSS", is an English former professional rugby league footballer who played in the 1980s and 1990s.

Background
Lazenby was born in Kingston upon Hull, East Riding of Yorkshire, England.

Playing career

County Cup Final appearances
Tracy Lazenby played , and was man of the match winning the White Rose Trophy in Wakefield Trinity's 8-11 defeat by Castleford in the 1990 Yorkshire County Cup Final during the 1990–91 season at Elland Road, Leeds on Sunday 23 September 1990.

Club career
Tracy Lazenby made his début for Wakefield Trinity on Tuesday 5 November 1985.

Genealogical information
Tracy Lazenby is the brother of the rugby league footballer who played in the 1980s for Hull F.C.; Colin Lazenby.

Note
Tracy Lazenby's forename is occasionally spelt with an additional e, i.e. Tracey.

References

External links
(archived by web.archive.org) Wakefield Trinity V Australia 1990

1959 births
Living people
Date of birth missing (living people)
English rugby league players
Hull F.C. players
Hull Kingston Rovers players
Penrith Panthers players
Rugby league players from Kingston upon Hull
Rugby league five-eighths
Wakefield Trinity captains
Wakefield Trinity players